Agapostemon virescens, the bicolored striped-sweat bee, is a species of sweat bee in the family Halictidae. It is found in North America, and is the official bee of the city of Toronto.

References

 </ref>

Further reading

External links

 

virescens
Articles created by Qbugbot
Insects described in 1775
Taxa named by Johan Christian Fabricius